The Women's Foundation California is a nonprofit foundation located in San Francisco. It was founded in 1980.

Profile 
The Women's Foundation California supports women and girls who have historically been under-served due to economic status, race or ethnicity, physical or mental ability, culture, religion, sexual orientation, immigration status or regional factors.

The Women's Foundation California distributes funds primarily through grants for which local organizations apply, referred to as Grantee Partners.

The Women's Foundation California invests in four areas:

Economic Justice
Reproductive Health and Sexual rights
Environment and Women
Leadership

The Foundation also leverages grantmaking with advocacy in local and state policy work to push for change that impacts women and girls, families and communities. Their work has resulted in policy wins that address human trafficking, domestic abuse and sexual violence, reproductive health, economic security and environmental justice.

See also
Washington Area Women's Foundation

References

External links
The Women's Foundation of California Official website
Sandra Kobrin, California Gender Report Stirs Legislative Push, Women's eNews, August 21, 2006
Women's issues to be aired today at Tech Museum, San Jose Mercury News, May 5, 2005 

Non-profit organizations based in San Francisco
Women's rights organizations
Organizations established in 1980
Women's organizations based in the United States
Women in California